Rumaila Operating Organization (ROO) is an international petroleum company based in Iraq. ROO is part of the Iraq Basra Oil Company and of a consortium with BP and PetroChina, which manages Rumaila in southern Iraq, one of the largest oilfields in the world.

Overview
Rumaila Operating Organization was founded by BP, CNPC and  Basra Oil Company (BOC) (formerly South Oil Company (SOC)) in order to manage the 20-year rehabilitation and expansion of Rumaila oil field in southern Iraq, which was discovered in 1953 and has been in operation since 1954, with extensive exploration and production since the late 1960s / 1970s.

Rumaila oil field is part of the so-called class of super-giant oilfields, with more than one billion barrels of recoverable oil. Current estimations of Rumailas total reserves lie around 17 billion barrels.  Production from the field is around one third of the country's total oil output.

The field is located in Southern Iraq, around 20 miles (32 km) from Kuwaits border and played an important role in the 1990 Gulf War, the 2003 Iraq invasion and following the Iraq war.

A new round for bidding of southern oil-fields in Iraq was first announced in 2008, following several years of turmoil due to the war and resulting in political and military unrest.

A Technical Service Contract was signed between BOC, BP, PetroChina and the State Oil Marketing Organization (SOMO) in 2009, detailing the establishment of ROO, the introduction of new technologies and infrastructure, training and equipment of staff, and an extensive drilling and expansion program at the Rumaila oilfield. Basra Oil, BP and PetroChina are the lead contractors. The agreement was extended in 2014 so that it now  runs until 2034.

Rumaila Operating Organization planned to hire mainly local employees to oversee the operations, with a smaller number of technical experts and managers from BP and CNPC. The operations of the company were scheduled to begin in July 2010. Plans by the consortium detailed the spending of more than $15 billion, between 2010 and 2020, to develop the field.

Initial production targets were set to raise the average daily production from 1.06 to 1.2 million barrels per day (bpd) and were reached by BP and the consortium in December 2010. By 2014, the production consistently ran over 1.3 million bpd and by January 2017 it had reached over 1.4 million bpd. Production since 2010 has increased by over 30%, putting it at a 27-year-high and for the first time in the oilfields history has been above 1.2 million bpd for five consecutive years. Current plans are to raise production to around 2 million bpd by 2020.

Since construction began in 2010, 250 new wells have been drilled, increasing the total amount by 50% and 14 degassing stations were renovated, environmentally accessed and land cleaned up. The connecting infrastructure, new roads, maintenance buildings, staff and office buildings were erected around the same time period and currently a new power station is in construction as well. Today the field has around 550 producing wells and 150 injection wells.

BP (38% ownership, headquartered in UK) and CNPC (37%, China) had earlier signed a contract with SOC (25%, Iraq) in 2009 to develop and increase production at Rumaila field, Iraq's largest.

Under ROO, the field has produced around 3 billion barrels of oil in total, generating a revenue of around $200 billion.

Around 6,500 to 7,000 Iraqis employees work at Rumaila, assisted by over 100 experts from BP, PetroChina and other international companies. Another 22,000-25,000 locals are involved in operations at Rumaila through contractors, operating throughout the entire value and supply chain.

ROO also finances and runs The Rumaila Social Welfare Fund (SWF) and the Rumaila Education Fund (REF), providing different forms of support, training, education, health and infrastructural aids to communities surrounding the Rumaila oilfield.

It was the highest annual rate of production for 30 years.

Philanthropy
Since 2012 ROO cooperates with the charity organization AMAR to support vulnerable people in the south of Iraq. The first project of this partnership was distributing food packages to over 1.000 families in need during the festival of Ramadan in July 2013. ROO also supports initiatives of emergency relief and health care, and strengthens local communities.

References

Oil and gas companies of Iraq
Energy companies established in 2010
Iraqi companies established in 2010